Riall Salud Johnson (born April 20, 1978) is a former professional gridiron football player.

Early years 
Riall grew up in Lynnwood, Washington, where he attended Mariner High School. At Mariner he was considered one of the top football prospects in the USA.

College 
He attended Stanford University. In his junior year at Stanford he tied for the Pac-10 lead in sacks with 13. In his senior year he not only led the Pac-10, but he also tied for the most sacks in the nation with future Carolina Panthers star Julius Peppers. And he became the first player ever to lead the Pac-10 in sacks in back to back years.

Professional career 
Despite all his success in college, he was selected in the 6th round of the 2001 NFL Draft by the Cincinnati Bengals. He played 3 years for the Bengals. He appeared in 32 games and made a total of 30 tackles most of which were on special teams.

After spending the 2008 CFL season with the Toronto Argonauts, Johnson was traded to the Winnipeg Blue Bombers for linebacker Zeke Moreno on February 19, 2009. He was traded to the Montreal Alouettes in September 2009.

Personal 
He is the brother of Teyo Johnson, a former wide receiver of the CFL's Calgary Stampeders.

References

External links 
Just Sports Stats
Argonauts.ca page
DatabaseFootball.com stats

1978 births
Living people
American football linebackers
Black Canadian players of Canadian football
Canadian players of American football
Players of Canadian football from British Columbia
Canadian emigrants to the United States
Cincinnati Bengals players
Stanford Cardinal football players
Toronto Argonauts players
People from White Rock, British Columbia
Canadian football defensive linemen
Sportspeople from Washington (state)
Winnipeg Blue Bombers players
Montreal Alouettes players
Amsterdam Admirals players
People from Lynnwood, Washington